Operation Egret was a military operation in Angola during September 1985 by the South African Defence Force (SADF) against People's Liberation Army of Namibia (PLAN) during the Angolan Civil War and South African Border War.

Background
In order to interrupt a planned raid into South-West Africa/Namibia from Angola by PLAN's Charlie detachment, the SADF planned an operation into Angola on 15 September 1985 to counter the proposed incursion. This would be the first deliberate operation into Angola since Operation Askari with strict instructions to avoid FAPLA forces. 500 men of 101 Battalion and Puma, Alouette and Impala aircraft of the SAAF, would sweep the areas between Evale,  Anhanca and Dova for the PLAN units. In nine separate contacts and one air attack, the SADF killed 15 PLAN soldiers and captured 103 with the operation ending on 22 September.

Order of battle

South African and South West Africa Territorial Forces
 101 Battalion

PLAN Forces
 PLAN "Charlie" detachment - Eighth Battalion

References

Further reading
 
 

Conflicts in 1985
Military history of Angola
Cross-border operations of South Africa
Battles and operations of the South African Border War
1985 in Angola
1985 in South Africa
September 1985 events in Africa